Augusto Luis Cantón Portugal (27 November 1928 – 3 February 1991) was an Argentine swimmer who competed at the 1948 Summer Olympics in the 100 m freestyle and  freestyle relay, reaching the final in the latter and coming 6th .

References

Swimmers at the 1948 Summer Olympics
Olympic swimmers of Argentina
Argentine male swimmers
Argentine male freestyle swimmers
1928 births
1991 deaths
20th-century Argentine people